Aethes macasiana is a species of moth of the family Tortricidae. It is found in Ecuador (Morona-Santiago Province).

References

External links

Moths described in 2001
Endemic fauna of Ecuador
macasiana
Moths of South America